Aldine Müller (born Aldina Rodrigues Raspini, 8 October 1953, São José dos Ausentes, Brazil) is a Brazilian actress. She was a key figure in the sexploitation film genre known as Pornochanchada in Brazil in the 1970s.

Müller was born in 1953 to a Portuguese mother and an Italian father. She was married and has an adult son, Cézar Raspini da Fonseca.

Filmography

Film

Television

References

External links

1953 births
Living people
Brazilian film actresses
Brazilian television actresses
Brazilian telenovela actresses
People from Rio Grande do Sul